The Victoria's Secret Fashion Show is an annual fashion show sponsored by Victoria's Secret, a brand of lingerie and sleepwear. Victoria's Secret uses the show to promote and market its goods in high-profile settings. The show features some of the world's leading fashion models, such as current Victoria's Secret Angels Heidi Klum, Adriana Lima, Alessandra Ambrosio, Karolina Kurkova, Selita Ebanks, Marisa Miller, Miranda Kerr, and Doutzen Kroes. This year, Behati Prinsloo replaced Miranda Kerr as the Pink spokesmodel.

The 13th fashion show featured some of the new Angels and also the returning Angels. There were special performances by Usher and Jorge Moreno, and the show was hosted by Heidi Klum.

Fashion show segments

Segment 1: Glamour Goddess 

 Adriana Lima returned to the runway to close the performance

Segment 2: Dangerous

Segment 3: The Moderns

Segment 4: PINK Planet

Segment 5: Ballet de Fleurs

Segment 6: Black Tie Holiday

Finale 
Marisa Miller and Maryna Linchuk led the finale.

Index

References

External links 
 VSFS 2008 Gallery
 The Victoria's Secret Fashion Show 2008 on YouTube

Victoria's Secret
2008 in fashion